NWS is an Australian television station based in Adelaide, Australia. It is owned-and-operated by the Nine Network. The station callsign, NWS, is an initialism of The NeWs South Australia.

History

Origins

NWS-9 was the first television broadcaster in Adelaide, beginning on 5 September 1959 from their Tynte Street studios. It was owned by Rupert Murdoch's News Limited (a subsidiary of his holding company News Corporation) through Southern Television Corporation Ltd who also owned city newspaper The News. Popular programs produced in its early days included the live variety shows Adelaide Tonight and Hey Hey It's Saturday (on-location specials), science show The Curiosity Show, The Country and Western Hour, and children's shows Channel Niners, Here's Humphrey and Pick Your Face. NWS also broadcast SANFL Matches from 1989 to 1992, earlier it had produced the first ever colour broadcast of that league's Grand Final in 1973.

In early 1980, NBN Limited became NWS's owner for A$19 million. In 1981, Hadjoin Pty. Ltd., a subsidiary of Parry's Esplanade Limited (later Parry Corporation), purchased 19.88% of NBN Limited for $6.7 million.

Following this, Parry then attempted to buy the Wansey family's stake in NBN, but was blocked by the Supreme Court of New South Wales, after which Parry revealed that he wanted to take over NBN (and thus NWS). Parry and the Lamb family then formed a deal – NBN would transfer NWS to the Lambs in exchange for their share of NBN which went to the Parrys. This ended NBN Limited's ownership of NWS.

Recent history
The Lamb family sold NWS to Southern Cross Broadcasting for $96 million in 1999, leading to redundancies among almost half of the station's staff.

On 30 May 2007, Southern Cross announced its sale of NWS-9 to WIN Corporation for $105 million. WIN took control on 1 July 2007.

It was reported on 3 June 2013 that Nine Entertainment Co. would immediately purchase Nine Adelaide (NWS) from WIN Corporation as part of a deal to secure international cricket television rights. Nine officially gained control of NWS on 1 July 2013. This move saw Nine Adelaide join Brisbane, Sydney and Melbourne as Nine Network owned-and-operated metropolitan stations leaving only Perth which was purchased only months later in September.

Managing Director of Nine Adelaide, Sean O'Brien, announced in late 2014 that within two years, the station would move from their Tynte Street location of over fifty years to new studios in the CBD.

The final broadcast from the Tynte Street studios was on 18 September 2015, followed a day later by the first transmission from the new street-level studios on Pirie Street.

Programming

Current in-house productions
 Nine News (Adelaide edition)

Previous in-house productions
 Adelaide Tonight
 The Curiosity Show
 The Country and Western Hour
 Channel Niners
 Here's Humphrey
 Pick Your Face
 Postcards
 Out of the Blue
 Garden Gurus SA
 Building Ideas
 Feeling Good
 Out of the Ordinary

News
Nine News Adelaide is presented from the studios of NWS Adelaide by Kate Collins and Brenton Ragless on weeknights with Will McDonald presenting on weekends. Sport is presented mostly in the studio by Tom Rehn on weekdays and by Corey Norris on weekends, with the weather presented by Jessica Braithwaite on weeknights and Chelsea Carey on the weekend.

News history
John Doherty was the station's first news presenter.

Between 1988 and 2007, the weeknight bulletin was presented by Rob Kelvin and the late Kevin Crease. They were one of the longest serving news duos in Australia.

Throughout the 1990s, Deanna Williams was the main fill-in presenter and state political reporter. Following her resignation in March 2002, either Kelvin or Crease would fill in for McGuinness on weekends, but in 2005 the situation arose where all three presenters were unavailable – leaving weekend sports presenter Mark Bickley to read the news.

Also during this time, the weekend bulletins consistently rated higher than its rival Seven News Adelaide in its timeslot, however, the weeknight bulletins continue to languish in second position behind Seven.

In late 2008, NWS-9 launched its own local version of the Nine Network's flagship current affairs program, A Current Affair, hosted by Adelaide journalist Kate Collins. It was axed only one year later.

On 26 November 2009, one day after the axing of the local A Current Affair was announced, Kelly Nestor announced live on air that her contract as Kelvin's weeknight co-anchor would not be renewed and she would finish on 18 December 2009.

On 22 February 2010, it was announced that senior reporter Michael Smyth would be joining Rob Kelvin at the newsdesk.

On 31 October 2010, Rob Kelvin announced that he would retire from the newsdesk after 32 years on the air. He would present his last bulletin on 31 December 2010 after 27 years anchoring the news. However, News Director, Tony Agars announced that Kelvin would continue to present the occasional special report and fill-in a few times a year when required. Kate Collins replaced Kelvin, joining Smyth at the news desk.

In October 2011, it was announced that Michael Smyth and Georgina McGuinness would not have their contracts renewed. From the end of November 2011 until December 2013, Kate Collins presented the bulletin solo on weeknights and Will McDonald replaced McGuinness as presenter for weekend bulletins at the end of December 2011.

Despite the national dominance of Nine News for many years, the Adelaide bulletin has failed to match the same ratings success seen in Sydney, Melbourne and Brisbane, and remains the lowest-rating news program in its market, formerly trailing rival Seven News Adelaide by around 100,000 viewers. This is reflected in the frequent position changes that have taken place at NWS over the years since it last won the local ratings in 2007.

Presenters and Reporters 

News presenters
 Kate Collins (Weeknights, 2011–present)
 Brenton Ragless (Weeknights, 2014–present)
 Will McDonald (Weekends, 2011–present)

Sports presenters
 Warren Tredrea (Weeknights, 2013–2021)
 Tom Rehn (Weekends, 2015– 2022   Weekdays 2022 - present)
 Corey Norris (Weekends, 2022 present)

Weather presenter
 Jessica Braithwaite (Weeknights, 2016–present)
 Chelsea Carey (Weekends 2019 - present)

News Reporters
 Edward Godfrey
 Ben Avery
 Chelsea Carey
 Keziah Sullivan
 Kate Lambe
 Harvey Biggs
 Ollie Haig (Today Adelaide reporter)
 Mike Lorigan 
 Kelly Hughes
 Beth Excell
 Ainsley Koch

Sport Reporters
 Tom Rehn
 Corey Norris
 Jack Berketa
 Will Crouch
 Josh Money 
 Vicki Schwarz

Notable Past Presenters

 Caroline Ainslie – Weeknight Presenter, 1977–1987 (Now Retired)
 Elise Baker – broke the news of Phil Walsh's death on Today in July 2015 (now a reporter on Seven News Adelaide)
 Sue Baron – Meteorologist, 1970s (Moved to ADS-7, later ADS-10 in 1980s as News Presenter. Now Retired)
 Mark Bickley – Weekend Sports, 2004–2009 (Now co-host of the afternoon Sports Show on talk-back radio station FiveAA)
 James Brayshaw – Sports Reporter, 2002 (Now a commentator for the Seven Network)
 Jarrad Brevi – Now with Nine News Sydney
 Nona Burden – Presenter/Reporter, 1970s–1980s
 Grant Cameron – Weekend Weather Presenter, 1979–1980s (Now with SAS)
 Roger Cardwell – Weeknight Presenter, 1974–1983 (Now Retired)
 Kevin Crease – Weeknight Presenter, 1960s–1974 and 1987–2007 (Deceased)
 Steve Cropper – Presenter/Reporter, 1980s
 K. G. Cunningham – Weekend Sports Presenter, 1975–2003 (Now with SAS)
 Joel Dry – Reporter, 2009–2011 (now with Seven News Brisbane)
 Tony Curtis – Presenter/Reporter, 1970s–1980s
 Troy Gray – Weekend Sports Presenter, 2008–2012
 John Doherty – Presenter, 1959–1960s (Now Retired)
 Sue Ellbourne – Weather, 1970s
 Georgina McGuinness – Weekend Presenter, 1987–2011
 Michael Smyth – Weeknight Presenter, 2008–2011

 Sue Garrard – Presenter/Reporter 1980s
 Clive Hale – Presenter, 1970s (Went on to become national anchor for the ABC, now deceased.)
 Paris Martin – Reporter (now with 10 News First Queensland)
 Keith Martyn – Weather, 1996–2007 (Retired, does occasional special news stories)
 Xavier Minniecon – Weekend Weather, 1997–2011
 Ray McGhee – Senior Reporter, 1979–2007 (Owns Mortgage Broker business and formerly an independent candidate in the 2010 Australian federal election in the seat of Boothby)
 Kelly Nestor – Weeknight Presenter, 2007–2009 (Now with AdelaideNOW)
 Barry Pitman – Weather, 1981–1996
 John Riddell – Weekend Presenter/Senior Reporter, 1981–1989 (Chief Presenter at SAS, Retired)
 Eliza Rugg – Reporter (now with Nine News Melbourne)
 Rob Kelvin – Weekday Presenter, 1979–2010 (current stand-in presenter)
 Jessica Rich – Presenter/Reporter, 2001–2004 (Now reporter at TCN-9 Sydney)
 Peter Sellen
 Deanna Williams – Presenter/Senior Reporter/State Political Reporter, 1990–2002 (Now Senior Reporter at SAS)
 Anne Wills – Weather, 1960s (Moved on to other networks hosting various programs. Became known as Ms Adelaide. Now retired)
 Kym Dillon – Sports Reporter/Weeknight then Weekend Sports Presenter, 1991–2015 (Made redundant)
 Virginia Langeberg –  Weeknight Weather Presenter 2014–2015

News Bulletin Titles

 NWS-9 News, Sport and Weather (1959–1965)
 Channel 9 News (1960s–early 1970s)
 National Nine News (early 1970s, 1976–1980, 1987–2008)
 Nine Eyewitness News (1974–1976)
 Nine Action News (1981–1986)
 Nine News (2008–present)

References

External links

 Official Site

Nine Network
1959 establishments in Australia
Television stations in South Australia
Television stations in Adelaide
Television channels and stations established in 1959